Robinson Branch is a stream in Vernon County in the U.S. state of Missouri. It is a tributary of West Fork Clear Creek.

Robinson Branch, previously called "Robinson Creek", has the name of a pioneer citizen.

References

Rivers of Vernon County, Missouri
Rivers of Missouri